The Oakley High School Stadium, also known as Irwin Stadium, Irwin Field and as KHRI# 109-51, in Oakley, Kansas was built in 1939 by a New Deal works program, the Works Progress Administration (WPA).  It has served at football games and track meets from 1939 to date.

The first usage of the stadium was on October 6, 1939, for '"the annual football classic"' between the Oakley Plainsmen versus the Colby Eagles, a night game under new floodlights, in which the Plainsmen were "trounced".

The building was listed on the U.S. National Register of Historic Places on April 9, 2013.  It was deemed locally significant in entertainment and recreation and government, and for its architecture, when considered and nominated as part of a Kansas-wide multiple property submission about New Deal-era historic resources.

References

External links

Buildings and structures in Logan County, Kansas
Works Progress Administration in Kansas
Event venues on the National Register of Historic Places in Kansas
Sports venues on the National Register of Historic Places in Kansas
Sports venues in Kansas
National Register of Historic Places in Logan County, Kansas
Sports venues completed in 1939
1939 establishments in Kansas
High school football venues in the United States
American football venues in Kansas